The Coast may refer to:
 The Coast (newspaper), a weekly newspaper in Halifax, Canada
 The Coast, Newark, New Jersey, a neighborhood in Newark, New Jersey, USA
 "The Coast", a song by Paul Simon from his 1990 album The Rhythm of the Saints
 "The Coast", a 2010 song by Court Yard Hounds
 The Coast (band), an indie rock band from Toronto, Ontario, Canada
 The Coast (EP), the 2006 self-titled debut EP by The Coast
 The Coast 89.7, the branding of CKOA-FM, a radio station in Cape Breton, Nova Scotia, Canada
 The Coast (radio station), a regional radio station based in Southampton, England

Radio stations

 KOST-FM
 WMNX-FM
 WFLC-HD2

See also 
 Coast (disambiguation)